The National Assembly, also transliterated as Milli Mejlis, is the legislative branch of government in Azerbaijan. The unicameral National Assembly has 125 deputies: previously 100 members were elected for five-year terms in single-seat constituencies and 25 were members elected by proportional representation; as of the latest election, however, all 125 deputies are returned from single-member constituencies.

Power in Azerbaijan is heavily concentrated in Ilham Aliyev, the President of Azerbaijan. Parliamentary elections in Azerbaijan are not free and fair.

History

Azerbaijan Democratic Republic (1918–1920)

Following the Russian Revolution in February 1917, a special committee consisting of deputies from Transcaucasian State Duma was created. In November, Transcaucasian Commissariat was created as the first government of independent Transcaucasia. The Sejm made up of representatives of three nations did not have a solid political platform as each nation looked after its own interests. This subsequently led to the dissolution of the Sejm on 25 May 1918.

On 27 May, 44 Muslim deputies of the Sejm gathered in Tbilisi and established Azerbaijan National Council to form the government of Azerbaijan. Mammad Emin Rasulzade was elected its chairman. On 28 May, the National Council passed a resolution proclaiming the independence of Azerbaijan Democratic Republic. On 16 June, the National Council and the Azerbaijani government moved to Ganja. At the seventh session of the council in Ganja chaired by Mammad Emin Rasulzade, it was decided to dissolve the council and transfer all legislative and executive power to the interim government of Azerbaijan headed by Fatali Khan Khoyski. Once the government was established, Azerbaijani was made the official state language. One of the priorities of the government before moving to Baku was to liberate Baku from Centrocaspian Dictatorship then in control of the city which took place on 15 September 1918. On 16 November when the National Council reconvenes and on 19 November, Rasulzade announces that all nationalities of Azerbaijan will be represented in the Azerbaijani Parliament to consist of 120 deputies.

Therefore, basing on 24 thousand representatives of nationalities of Azerbaijan, the Azerbaijani parliament made up of 80 Muslims, 21 Armenians, 10 Russians, 1 German, and 1 Jew was established on 29 November and convened on 7 December 1918. Thus, the first session of the parliament took place in the building of former Zeynalabdin Tagiyev Russian Muslim School located on present-day Istiglaliyyat Street of Baku and was chaired by Rasulzade. Alimardan Topchubashov was elected the Speaker of the Parliament, Hasanbey Agayev – Deputy Speaker.
By the end of 1919, there were 11 various political party factions in the parliament represented by 96 deputies. During its 17-month existence, the parliament held 145 sessions with the last session being convened on 27 April 1920 on the eve of the Russian occupation of Azerbaijan. A total of 270 resolutions were sponsored, 230 of which were passed. Parliamentary delegations of Azerbaijan signed several friendship treaties with Turkey, Iran, Great Britain, and the US and a defense pact with Georgia; attended Paris Peace Conference several times requesting recognition from Western countries. In January 1920, Azerbaijan Democratic Republic was de facto recognized by the Peace Conference.

Supreme Soviet of Azerbaijan SSR

During the last session of the Azerbaijani Parliament on 27 April 1920 under the pressure of the Bolshevik Russian 11th Red Army and an ultimatum from the Caucasian Committee of the Russian Communist Party which invaded Azerbaijan, the deputies decided to disband the government in favor of the Bolsheviks to avoid bloodshed.
Once the Bolsheviks took over, they abolished all structures of the Azerbaijani government and established the Azerbaijan Interim Revolutionary Committee administered by Azerbaijani communists Nariman Narimanov, Aliheydar Garayev, Gazanfar Musabekov, Hamid Sultanov and Dadash Bunyadzade. The Bolsheviks dissolved the Azerbaijani Army, executed its generals and officers, and nationalized private industries.

In May 1921, the first All-Azerbaijan Soviet Session made up of newly elected deputies from all regions of Azerbaijan convened in Baku. The elected deputies were mainly drawn from poor, uneducated, unprepared factory workers and villagers which facilitated complete rule from Moscow. The first session established the Azerbaijan Central Executive Committee consisting of 75 members and its board with 13 members. From 1921 through 1937, nine sessions of All-Azerbaijan Soviets were convened.
In 1937, during the 9th session of the All-Azerbaijani Soviets a new Azerbaijan SSR Constitution was ratified and the new legislative body the Supreme Soviet of Azerbaijan SSR was established.

The first elections to Supreme Soviet took place on 24 June 1938. Out of 310 deputies elected, 107 were workers, 88 collective farmers and 115 educated civil servants. Seventy-two of the deputies were women. Due to the authoritarian nature of Soviet rule where most new initiatives were met as conspiracies against the state, the parliament was virtually ineffective.
Due to multiple reforms and restructuring in the government of the Azerbaijan SSR in the 1970s–1980s, the role of the Supreme Soviet increased. Many legislative reforms including the ratification of the new Azerbaijan SSR Constitution of 1977 took place. After the demands of the Armenian SSR to transfer the NKAO region of Azerbaijan to Armenia, the parliament was largely passive and indifferent.
On 18 October 1991 the Supreme Soviet passed a resolution confirming the restoration of the independence of Azerbaijan.

Parliament of the Republic of Azerbaijan

The first Azerbaijani parliamentary election was held in late 1990, when the Supreme Soviet already held discussions on independence of Azerbaijan from the Soviet Union. The 1995 parliamentary election was the first to be held after the restoration of Azerbaijan's independence.

The assembly is headed by its Speaker assisted by the First Deputy Speaker and two deputy speakers. Sahiba Gafarova is the current speaker of the assembly, Ali Huseynli is the First Deputy Speaker and, Fazail Ibrahimli and Adil Aliyev are deputy speakers. The work at the parliament is administered by the Parliament Apparatus headed by Sefa Mirzayev, aided by Assistant Manager Elkhan Ahmadov. The Parliament Apparatus is subdivided into Department of State Roster for Territorial Units and Municipalities, and Codification Sector Department.

In the 2010 parliamentary elections, the ruling New Azerbaijan Party strengthened its grasp on the legislature, securing a majority of 73 out of 125 seats. The other seats went to nominally independent, government-leaning candidates, and to "soft opposition" parties. The two major opposition parties (Musavat and the Parties of the People's Front of Azerbaijan) lost their previous eight seats, thus resulting in an opposition-free Parliament. The Central Election Commission said turnout was 50.1%, out of a total 4.9 million people eligible to vote. Opposition leaders suggested the low turnout was due to candidate disqualifications by the CEC, and consequent discouragements to vote after their choice of candidate was excluded.

The United States declared that the elections "did not meet international standards", while the Organization for Security and Co-operation in Europe, EU and Council of Europe highlighted some positive aspects, while stating that "the conduct of the elections did not represent significant progress in the process of the country’s democratic development".

2015 Parliamentary elections resulted in 72 seats won by the ruling party. Currently, Parliament consists of 15 parliamentary committees:

Legal Policies and State Structuring Committee, chaired by first deputy speaker of the parliament, MP Ali Huseynli
Defense and Security Committee, chaired by MP Ziyafet Asgarov
Economic Policies Committee, chaired by MP Tahir Mirkishili 
Committee on Natural Resources, Energy and Ecology, chaired by MP Sadig Gurbanov
Committee on Agrarian Policies, chaired by MP Tahir Rzayev 
Social Policies Committee, chaired by MP Musa Guliyev
Committee on Regional Issues, chaired by MP Siyavush Novruzov
Committee on Science and Education, chaired by MP Bakhtiyar Aliyev
Committee on Cultural Issues, chaired by MP Ganira Pashayeva
Committee on Public Unions and Religious entities, chaired by deputy speaker of the Parliament, MP Fazail Ibrahimli
Committee on Youth and Sport, chaired by deputy speaker of the Parliament, MP Adil Aliyev
Committee on Health Issues, chaired by MP Ahliman Emiraslanov
Committee on Family, Women and Children Affairs, chaired by MP Hijran Huseynova
International and Interparliamentary Relations Committee, chaired by MP Samad Seyidov
Human Rights Committee, chaired by MP Zahid Oruj

In addition to the parliamentary committees, Milli Majlis has a Chamber of Accounting, Toponyms and Disciplinary Commissions. The Disciplinary Commission is chaired by MP Eldar Ibrahimov. The parliament publishes its own newspaper, Azərbaycan qəzeti (Azerbaijan newspaper), widely distributed around the country.

Parliament also established more than 80 "Interparliamentary working groups" with the parliaments of more than 80 states in the world.

Chairmen of the National Assembly (Supreme Soviet to 1991, National Council 1991–1992) of Azerbaijan

Elmira Gafarova 5 February 1991 – 5 March 1992.
Yagub Mammadov 5 March 1992 – 18 May 1992
Isa Gambar 18 May 1992 – 13 June 1993
Heydar Aliyev 24 June 1993 – 5 November 1993
Rasul Guliyev 5 November 1993 – 11 September 1996
Murtuz Alasgarov 16 October 1996 – 2 December 2005
Ogtay Asadov 2 December 2005– 10 March 2020
 Sahiba Gafarova 10 March 2020–today

See also
Politics of Azerbaijan
Government of Azerbaijan
Cabinet of Azerbaijan
Azerbaijani parliamentary election, 2010
List of legislatures by country
List of political parties in Azerbaijan
Constitution of Azerbaijan

References

External links
 Official website of the National Assembly of Azerbaijan
 History of the Milli Mejlis of Azerbaijan
 Official page dedicated to the 90th anniversary of Milli Mejlis of the Republic of Azerbaijan
 Constitution of the Republic of Azerbaijan

1918 establishments in Azerbaijan
Buildings and structures in Baku
Government of Azerbaijan
Azerbaijan
Azerbaijan
Azerbaijan